Vörös is a Hungarian surname from a nickname meaning "red" in Hungarian. Notable people with the surname include:
 Ferenc Vörös (1922), Hungarian retired swimmer
 János Vörös (1891–1968), Hungarian military officer and politician
 Péter Vörös (1977), Hungarian football player
 Virág Vörös (1999), Hungarian ski jumper
 Zsuzsanna Vörös (1977), retired Hungarian modern pentathlete

See also 
 Voros (disambiguation)

Hungarian-language surnames
Surnames from nicknames